A bruja is a witch.

Bruja may also refer to:
 Brujas F.C., a Costa Rican football club
 Bruja (novel), a 2001 novel based on the television series Angel
 La Bruja (film), a 1954 horror film
 Caridad de la Luz (born 1977), or La Bruja, Puerto Rican poet, actress, and activist
 "Bruja", a song by Arca from Kick III

See also
 Brujah, a fictional clan of vampires in Vampire: The Masquerade
 El Cazador de la Bruja, a 2007 anime television series
 Mägo de Oz (La Bruja), a 1997 album by Mägo de Oz
 Las Brujas de South Beach, a Spanish-language telenovela
 Brujería (disambiguation)
 Brujo (disambiguation)